Anne Frances Milton (née Turner; born 3 November 1955) is a British politician who served as Minister of State for Skills and Apprenticeships from 2017 to 2019. She was Member of Parliament (MP) for Guildford from 2005 to 2019. Elected as a Conservative, she had the whip removed in September 2019 and subsequently sat as an independent politician.

Early life and career
Anne Frances Turner was born on 3 November 1955 in Sussex, England to Patrick and Nesta Turner. She attended Haywards Heath Grammar School in West Sussex. She trained as a nurse at St Bartholomew's Hospital in London and obtained a diploma in district nursing from the London South Bank University. Milton worked for the NHS for 25 years as a nurse which included working in primary care, research and supporting palliative care nurses. During the 1980s, she was a shop steward for the Royal College of Nursing.

Milton was a councillor for the Borough of Reigate and Banstead from 1999 to 2004 and was  Conservative Group leader on the council from 2000 to 2003 and a member of the South East England Regional Assembly.  She applied to go on the Conservative Party's list of Parliamentary candidates in 1999 and was shortlisted in the selections for Bexhill and Battle and for Bridgwater but was not selected for a seat for the 2001 general election.

Parliamentary career

Milton was selected to contest the Guildford parliamentary constituency in the 2005 general election, a seat which the Conservatives had unexpectedly lost in 2001 to the Liberal Democrat Sue Doughty with the constituency becoming a marginal. She was elected as the MP for Guildford at the 2005 general election with a margin of victory of 347 votes.

After the election, she was appointed to the Health Select Committee serving till December 2006. During the 2005–2010 parliament, Milton worked as the Shadow Minister for Tourism from November 2006 and then the Shadow Minister for Health in July 2007. In February 2006, Milton was among a minority of Conservative MPs to oppose exceptions for private clubs from the proposed Smoking ban in England. Milton had previously announced her opposition to a partial ban, stating it was "the worst possible solution".

Milton held her seat in the 2010 general election and increased her majority to 7,782 votes (14%). In July 2010, Milton suggested that doctors should describe obese patients as 'fat' to encourage them to take responsibility for their condition. This was criticised by campaigners who pointed out that a clinical definition was being replaced with a subjective, pejorative term.

During the 2010–2015 parliament, she served as Parliamentary Under-Secretary at the Department of Health, then, as a result of a ministerial reshuffle in September 2012, Milton was appointed a Government Whip (Lord Commissioner of HM Treasury), Vice-Chamberlain of the Household and later Treasurer of the Household. “You have to know the MPs very well,” Milton said of her time in the Whips' Office. “If you’re working successfully, it doesn’t necessarily mean that you can avoid a rebellion but you should always be able to predict a vote spot-on, or at the very worst one or two out.”

She abstained on the parliamentary vote on the legalisation of same sex marriage in February 2013 citing a lack of consensus amongst her constituents. In March 2015, she was appointed to the Privy Council of the United Kingdom and therefore granted the title The Right Honourable. She voted for the United Kingdom to remain with the European Union (EU) in the June 2016 membership referendum. Milton was re-elected as MP for Guildford in the 2017 snap general election. After the election, she was selected as the Minister of State for Skills and Apprenticeships and the Minister for Women.

On 23 October 2018, Milton resigned from the Commons Reference Group on Representation and Inclusion, chaired by Commons speaker John Bercow, citing incompetence in Bercow's ability to tackle bullying and sexual harassment problems in Parliament.

On 23 July 2019, Milton resigned as Minister of State for Skills and Apprenticeships shortly before Boris Johnson was announced as the new leader of the Conservative Party and, thus, Prime Minister. She said that she could not serve in a government which said there was a possibility of the UK leaving the European Union with no deal. She had the whip removed in September 2019 and subsequently sat as an independent politician. She stood for re-election in the 2019 general election as an independent and lost to the Conservative candidate Angela Richardson.

Post-political career
In 2021, Milton joined KPMG as an associate.

Personal life
She married her first husband Neil Milton in 1979 in Haywards Heath; the couple later divorced. Her second husband, Dr. Graham Henderson, whom she married in February 2000 in Surrey, is a former local medical director at Virgin Healthcare. Milton lives in Surrey and has four children, one of whom is yachtswoman Nikki Henderson.

Notes

References

External links

|-

|-

|-

1955 births
Living people
English nurses
Conservative Party (UK) MPs for English constituencies
Councillors in Surrey
Female members of the Parliament of the United Kingdom for English constituencies
Independent members of the House of Commons of the United Kingdom
Members of the Parliament of the United Kingdom for Guildford
Members of the Privy Council of the United Kingdom
People from Cuckfield
UK MPs 2005–2010
UK MPs 2010–2015
UK MPs 2015–2017
UK MPs 2017–2019
21st-century British women politicians
Conservative Party (UK) councillors
Politics of Guildford
21st-century English women
21st-century English people
Women councillors in England